Azri Iskandar (born 1968) is a Malaysian actor. He has worked in the Malaysian film industry since the 1990s.

Filmography

Film

Television series

Telemovie

References

External links
 Leftenan Adanan at FilemKita.com 
 
 Leftenan Adnan Azri Iskandar
 Biodata Sinema Malaysia
 
 Sirah Junjungan

Living people
Malaysian people of Malay descent
Malaysian male actors
1968 births